Pulver is the debut album by Swedish blackened rock  band Lifelover, released in 2006. The album art depicts a friend of the band reclining in a field of wood anemones while covered in pig's blood the band bought from a local butcher shop.

Track listing

Personnel
 – vocals, speech, guitar, lyrics
 B – vocals, bass, piano, lyrics
 1853 – vocals (on "Vardagsnytt" and "Herrens hand"), speech, lyrics
 LR – lyrics

2006 debut albums
Lifelover albums